Fred Griffitt Comer (February 19, 1893 in Topeka, Kansas – October 12, 1928 in Lawrence, Massachusetts) was an American racecar driver. Like many drivers of his era, he was a board track racing specialist and made 43 AAA Championship Car starts on the board ovals with one win in 1926 on the Atlantic City track and one pole.  He also made four starts in the Indianapolis 500 with a best finish of 4th place in 1926. He finished a career best 5th in 1924 AAA National Championship points. Comer died from injuries sustained in a racing accident at Rockingham Park board track in New Hampshire.

Indianapolis 500 results

References

1893 births
1928 deaths
AAA Championship Car drivers
Indianapolis 500 drivers
Racing drivers from Kansas
Racing drivers who died while racing
Sports deaths in New Hampshire
Sportspeople from Topeka, Kansas